The National Security Council of Antigua and Barbuda was established in 2006 by The National Security Council Act of 2006.

Role 
The role of the National Security Council as defined by the National Security Council Act is to; create policies for government ministries relating to national security. Make recommendations and reports to the Prime Minister. And, monitor programs established by ministries that may relate to national security.

Membership

References 

Antigua and Barbuda